Rudravaram may refer to:
Rudravaram, Guntur, a village in Guntur district, Andhra Pradesh
Rudravaram, Nandyal district, a village in Rudravaran mandal, Nandyal district, Andhra Pradesh
Rudravaram, Prakasam, a village in Prakasam district, Andhra Pradesh
Rudravaram, Machilipatnam mandal, a village in Machilipatnam mandal, Krishna district, Andhra Pradesh
Sanarudravaram, a village in Kalidindi mandal of Krishna district, Andhra Pradesh